Flag desecration is the desecration of a flag, violation of flag protocol, or various acts that intentionally destroy, damage, or mutilate a flag in public. In the case of a national flag, such action is often intended to make a political point against a country or its policies. Some countries have laws forbidding methods of destruction (such as burning in public) or forbidding particular uses (such as for commercial purposes); such laws may distinguish between desecration of the country's own national flag and flags of other countries. Some countries have also banned the desecration of all types of flags from inside the country to other country flags.

Background
Actions that may be treated as desecration of a flag include burning it (flag burning), urinating, defecating or ejaculating on it, defacing it with slogans, stepping upon it, damaging it with stones; bullets; or any other missile, cutting or ripping it, improperly flying it, verbally insulting it, dragging it on the ground, or eating it, among other things.

Flag desecration may be undertaken for a variety of reasons. It may be a protest against a country's foreign policy, including one's own, or the nature of the government in power there. It may be a protest against nationalism or a deliberate and symbolic insult to the people of the country represented by the flag. It may also be a protest at the very laws prohibiting the act of desecrating a flag.

Burning or defacing a flag is a crime in some countries. In countries where it is not, the act may still be prosecuted as disorderly conduct, arson, or; if conducted on someone else's property; as theft or vandalism.

By jurisdiction

Algeria
In Algeria, flag desecration is a crime. According to article 160 bis of the Algerian penal code, the intentional and public shredding, distortion, or desecration of the national flag is punishable by 5 to 10 years of imprisonment.

In 2010, an Algerian court convicted 18 people of flag desecration and punished them by up to 6 years of imprisonment and $10,000 in fines after protests about jobs and housing.

Argentina
The Penal Code (Código Penal) on its Article 222 criminalizes the public desecration of the national flag, coat of arms, national anthem, or any provincial symbol, imposing from 1 to 4 years of imprisonment.

Armenia 
The Armenian criminal code punishes any insult to the flag (as well as to the coat of arms and the national anthem) with community service of up to two years or imprisonment of up to one year.

Australia

Legality
Flag desecration is not, in itself, illegal in Australia. However, flag desecration must be compliant with the law.

In Coleman v Kinbacher & Anor (Qld Police), Coleman was successfully prosecuted for flag burning, not because of its political nature, but because given the size of the flag, the use of petrol as an accelerant, and the fact that it was in an open park area, many members of the public experienced "concern, fright and anger", and in these circumstances flag burning could be considered disorderly conduct.

Attempts to ban flag burning
There have been several attempts to pass bills making flag burning illegal in Australia, none of which have yet been successful. In 1989, 1990, 1991 and 1992,  National Party MP Michael Cobb introduced bills making it an offence to desecrate, dishonour, burn, mutilate or destroy the Australian national flag. On each occasion, the bill failed. As of May 2016, the most recent bill which attempted to ban flag burning was the Flags Amendment (Protecting Australian Flags) Bill 2016, which was introduced by National Party MP George Christensen but lapsed in April 2016.

Historical occurrences
During the 2005 Cronulla riots, a Lebanese-Australian youth, whose name has been kept secret, climbed a Returned and Services League (RSL) club building and tore down its flag before setting it on fire. The youth was sentenced to 12 months probation not for flag desecration but for the destruction of property of the RSL. In October of that year the youth accepted an invitation from the RSL to carry the Australian flag along with war veterans in the Anzac Day march the following year. However, the RSL was forced to withdraw this invitation as it received phone calls from people threatening to pelt the youth with missiles on the day. The head of the New South Wales RSL was quoted as saying that "the people who made these threats ought to be bloody ashamed of themselves".

In 2006, Australian contemporary artist Azlan McLennan burnt an Australian flag and displayed it on a billboard outside the Trocadero artspace in Footscray, Victoria. He called the artpiece Proudly UnAustralian.

The socialist youth group Resistance marketed "flag-burning kits"inspired by, and to protest, the censorship of Azlan McLennan's artto university students.

Tasmanian Aboriginal Centre worker Adam Thompson burned the Australian flag on the week of Australia Day (2008) celebrations in Launceston's City Park to the cheers of about 100 people, who were rallying against what they call "Invasion Day".

Tent embassy activists burned the Australian flag on 27 January 2012 at the entrance to Canberra's Parliament House as they called for Aboriginal sovereignty over Australia.

Austria
In Austria flag desecration is illegal under §248 Strafgesetzbuch. Offenders can be fined or punished with up to 6 months of imprisonment. Under §317 Strafgesetzbuch desecration of flags of foreign states or international organizations can be punished if Austria maintains diplomatic relations with them or belongs to the respective organization.

Belgium
Flag desecration is not forbidden by Belgian law. Flemish nationalists have burned Belgian flags on at least one occasion.

Brazil
Brazilian law number 5700, chapter V, from 1971, concerns respect and the national flag:

Article 30 states that, when in the flag is being marched or paraded (for example, when the national anthem is being played), everyone present must take a respectful attitude, standing in silence. Males must remove any head coverings. Military personnel must salute or present arms according to their corps' internal regulations.

Article 31 states that it is prohibited:

Article 32 states that flags in a bad condition must be sent to the nearest military unit for incineration on Flag Day according to ceremonial procedures.

Article 33 states that, except at diplomatic missions such as embassies and consulates, no foreign flag may be flown without a Brazilian flag of the same size in a prominent position alongside it.

Chapter VI of the law states, in article 35, that the act of a civilian breaking this law is considered a misdemeanor, punished with a fine of one to four times the highest reference value active in the country, doubled in repeated infringement cases. In the Brazilian Armed Forces' Military Penal Code, article 161, a soldier, airman or seaman who disrespects any national symbol is punished with one to two years' detention; officers may be declared unsuitable for their rank.

Canada

Canada has no laws prohibiting flag burning or desecration. Acts of this nature are forms of expression protected by the Canadian Charter of Rights and Freedoms.

In 1990, during heated political times around the Meech Lake Accord, the flag of Quebec was desecrated by protestors in Brockville, Ontario opposed to Quebec's language laws after the Canadian flag had been burnt in protests in Quebec. Televised images of individuals stepping on the Quebec flag were played in Quebec and contributed to the deterioration in relations between Quebec and English Canada. The incident, seen as a metaphor of Canada's perceived rejection of Quebec (and of Quebec's distinctiveness in the demise of the Meech Lake Accord) was invoked by Quebec nationalists during the run-up to the 1995 referendum on Quebec independence and is still remembered today.

In 1999, members of the Westboro Baptist Church from the United States staged a burning of the Canadian Flag outside of the Supreme Court of Canada in Ottawa, Ontario. This was to protest legalization of same-sex marriage which was being adjudicated by the Canadian court.

Chile
The Ley de Seguridad Interior del Estado, articles 6 and 7, defines as a crime the public desecration of the national flag, coat of arms, the name of the country or the national hymn, and imposes a period of imprisonment, relegation or estrangement for a period between 541 days and three years.

China

Flag desecration is prohibited in China. The penal code provides for imprisonment up to three years, criminal detention, public surveillance, or deprivation of political rights for "whoever desecrates the National Flag or the National Emblem of the People's Republic of China by intentionally burning, mutilating, scrawling on, defiling or trampling upon it in a public place".

Hong Kong
Chinese laws concerning flag desecration were incorporated into Hong Kong law as the National Flag and National Emblem Ordinance in 1997 as required by Annex III of the territory's constitution. The Regional Flag and Regional Emblem Ordinance is the equivalent statute in respect of the Hong Kong flag. Both ordinances ban desecration of the Chinese flag and Hong Kong flag, respectively, through methods including "burning, mutilating, scrawling on, defiling or trampling".

In 1999, two individuals were convicted for desecration of the Regional Flag of Hong Kong and the Chinese flag. They were found guilty by a magistrate, had the conviction overturned in the High Court but the convictions were restored by the Court of Final Appeal. They were bound over to keep the peace on their own recognisance of $2,000 for 12 months for each of the two charges. In the judgement, Chief Justice Andrew Li said although the Basic Law of Hong Kong guarantees freedom of speech, flag desecration is not legal because there are other protest methods.

Social activist Koo Sze-yiu has been convicted several times of flag desecration. He was sentenced to a nine-month prison term in 2013 for the offence. However, the sentence was reduced to four months and two weeks after an appeal. In March 2016 he was sentenced to a six-week prison term for burning the regional flag in Wanchai on HKSAR Establishment Day in 2015. Koo responded that "he is happy to be punished as being jailed is part of the life of an activist, and he would continue to protest against the Beijing and Hong Kong governments and fight for democracy." In January 2021, Koo was again jailed, this time for four months, for displaying an inverted Chinese flag with slogans written on it in July 2020.

In October 2016, some miniature Chinese and Hong Kong flags that had been placed by pro-Beijing legislators in the Legislative Council chamber were flipped upside down by lawmaker Cheng Chung-tai, who regarded them as "cheap patriotic acts". In April 2017 he was charged with flag desecration. He alleged that the arrest was part of a "general cleansing" of dissenting voices ahead of Carrie Lam's inauguration as new chief executive. On 29 September 2017, the Eastern Magistrates' Court found Cheng guilty and fined him $5,000.

In December 2019, a 13-year-old girl was sentenced to 12 months probation for flag desecration during the 2019–20 Hong Kong protests. She received a curfew as well as a criminal record; the act was described as "rash" by magistrate Kelly Shui. Government intervention was on the basis of "(Maliciously) challenging the national sovereignty".

Croatia
Croatian history recalls the burning of the flag of the Kingdom of Hungary during the 1895 visit of Emperor Franz Joseph to Zagreb. Two people involved in the incident, Stjepan Radić and Vladimir Vidrić, later pursued notable careers in politics and literature, respectively. In modern Croatia it is illegal to desecrate any flag or to treat any flag in a disrespectful manner. Offenders are punishable with up to one year of imprisonment.

Denmark
In Denmark, it is legal to burn or desecrate the national flag, the Dannebrog. However it is illegal to publicly burn or desecrate the flags of foreign countries, the United Nations and Council of Europe according to section 110(e) of the Danish penal code because Parliament has decided that burning or desecrating these is a matter of foreign relations, as it could be construed as a threat. This law is rarely enforced; the last conviction was in 1936.

Faroe Islands
In the autonomous Faroe Islands, the flag law states that the Faroese flag, Merkið, may not be desecrated, "neither by words nor by deeds".

Finland
According to the law on the Finnish flag, it is illegal to desecrate the flag, treat it in disrespecting manner, or remove it from a public place without permission.

France
According to French law, a person outraging the French national anthem or the French flag during an event organized or regulated by public authorities is liable to a fine of €7,500, and six months' imprisonment if performed in a gathering. The law targets "outrageous behaviour" during public ceremonies and major sports events.

This clause was added as an amendment to a large bill dealing with internal security, in reaction to a football match during which there had been whistles against La Marseillaise, but also to similar actions during public ceremonies. The amendment initially prohibited such behaviour regardless of the context, but a parliamentary commission later restricted its scope to events organized or regulated by public authorities, which is to be understood, according to the ruling of the Constitutional Council, as events organized by public authorities, mass sport matches and other mass events taking place in enclosures, but not private speech, literary or artistic works, or speech during events not organized or regulated by public authorities.

In 2006, a man who had publicly burnt a French flag stolen from the façade of the city hall of Aurillac during a public festival, organized and regulated by public authorities, was fined €300.

A July 2010 law makes it a crime to desecrate the French national flag in a public place, but also to distribute images of a flag desecration, even when done in a private setting, if the objective is to create trouble in public space. On 22 December 2010, an Algerian national was the first person to be convicted under the new status, and ordered to pay a €750 after breaking the pole of a flag hung in the Alpes-Maritimes prefecture a day prior.

Germany

Under the German criminal code (§90a Strafgesetzbuch (StGB)), it is illegal to revile or damage the German federal flag as well as any flags of its states in public. Offenders can be fined or sentenced to a maximum of three years in prison, or fined or sentenced to a maximum of five years in prison if the act was intentionally used to support the eradication of the Federal Republic of Germany or to violate constitutional rights. Actual convictions because of a violation of the criminal code need to be balanced against the constitutional right of the freedom of expression, as ruled multiple times by Germany's constitutional court.

The original law from 1932 was expanded in 1935 to include the Flag of Nazi Germany.

Since 2020, it is also punishable by up to three years of imprisonment to damage or revile any flag of a foreign country (§104 StGB). Until then, only flags that were shown publicly by tradition, event, or routinely by representatives of an official foreign entity were protected. The legislative reform to include also unofficially or privately used flags was an explicit reaction to the repeated burning of Israeli flags during anti-Israeli protests.

As part of that reform, a newly formed §90c StGB was introduced that extends the scope of protection to the flag and anthem of the European Union.

After the fall of the Berlin Wall in November 1989, many East Germans cut out the emblem from their national flag in support for a reunified, democratic Germany. This flag is now used by the Federal Foundation for the Reappraisal of the SED Dictatorship.

Greece
Under article 188 of Greece's Penal code, flag desecration, along with desecration of other Greek symbols,  is illegal and punishable with prison time of up to 2 years, or a fine.

Hungary

During a demonstration at the beginning of the Hungarian revolution of 1956 someone in the crowd cut out the communist coat of arms from the Hungarian flag, leaving a distinctive hole, and others quickly followed suit. The "flag with a hole" became a symbol of the Hungarian resistance. The practice of cutting out the communist coat of arms was also followed by other Eastern Bloc countries, such as Romania, especially during the Revolutions of 1989.

India

The Indian Flag Code is a set of laws that govern the usage of the Flag of India. The Bureau of Indian Standards is in charge of the enforcement of the manufacture of the flag according to the guidelines.

Violation of the code may invite severe punishments and penalties. The code was written in 2002 and merged the following acts: provisions of the Emblems and Names (Prevention of Improper Use) Act, 1950 (No.12 of 1950) and the Prevention of Insults to National Honour Act, 1971 (No. 69 of 1971).

The Indian Flag Code was often criticized for being too rigid and prevented ordinary citizens from displaying the flag on homes and other buildings. For many years, only government officials and other government buildings could unfurl the flag. That changed in 2001 when Naveen Jindal won a court case in the Supreme Court of India to give Indians the right to unfurl the flag publicly. The Indian cricket batsman Sachin Tendulkar was accused of sporting the flag on his cricket helmet below the BCCI emblem. He later changed it and placed the flag above the emblem. The flag code was updated in 2005; some new provisions include that the flag cannot be worn under the waist or on undergarments.

Iraq
In 2004, many copies of the proposed new flag for Iraq were burnt (see flag of Iraq). There were no such examples of burning the current Iraqi national flags, even by political opponents, as both contain the words Allahu Akbar (God is great), so this would be seen as a religious insult in Islam.

Ireland

The Department of the Taoiseach's guide to the flag of Ireland includes a list of "practices to avoid". This states in part "The National Flag should never be defaced by placing slogans, logos, lettering or pictures of any kind on it, for example at sporting events." A tricolour inscribed "Davy Keogh says hello" waved continually since 1981 has given its eponymous bearer a modicum of fame among Republic of Ireland soccer supporters. Guinness ran a promotion before the 2002 FIFA World Cup distributing Irish flags to supporters in pubs, on which the tricolour's white band was defaced with Guinness's harp logo (which is similar to, but different from, the harp on the Irish coat of arms). Guinness apologised after public criticism. Cecilia Keaveney said in a subsequent Dáil debate, "It may not be possible to address defacing the flag through legislation, but the House must issue a strong message that this is unacceptable."

Seán O'Casey's 1926 play The Plough and the Stars attracted controversy for its critical view of the Easter Rising, in particular a scene in which a tricolour is brought into a pub frequented by a prostitute. On 7 May 1945, the day before V-E Day, celebrating unionist students in Trinity College Dublin raised the flags of the victorious Allies over the college; when onlookers in College Green began jeering, some took down the flag of neutral Ireland, set fire to it and tossed it away, provoking a small riot. In response, nationalist students from University College Dublin, including future Taoiseach Charles Haughey, burned the British flag in Grafton Street. The Provost of Trinity College apologised for the incident, which was not reported in Irish newspapers owing to wartime censorship.

Israel

In 2007 six teenagers in the South Tel Aviv suburb of Bat Yam were arrested for burning an Israeli flag. This incident was considered serious by the police and others since the youths were suspected in other acts of vandalism and claimed to be Satanists.

In 2016, Israel passed an amendment, meaning those convicted of deliberately burning an Israeli flag, or the flag of any allied country, face up to three years in prison.

Italy

Japan
In Japan, under Chapter 4, Article 92 of the Criminal Code, any desecration of a recognized foreign nation's national flag and symbol to dishonour that particular nation is prohibited and punishable by fine or penal labour, but only on complaint by the foreign government.

In May 1958, the flag of the People's Republic of China, the Wǔ Xīng Hóngqí, at a postage stamp convention was pulled down and damaged, but as Japan did not recognize the PRC at the time, the law was not applied. In February 2011, Japanese ultra-rightists held a protest over the Kuril islands dispute outside of the Russian embassy in Tokyo, during which they dragged a Russian flag on the ground; Russian foreign minister Sergei Lavrov stated that his ministry had asked the Japanese government to launch a criminal case over the incident.

However, there has never been a law explicitly prohibiting desecration of the Japanese flag, the Hinomaru. Absent such law, the act of desecration is implicitly protected by Article 21 covering freedom of speech in the Constitution of Japan.

On 26 October 1987, an Okinawan supermarket owner burned the Hinomaru, before the start of the National Sports Festival of Japan. The flag burner, Shōichi Chibana, burned the national flag not only to show opposition to atrocities committed by the wartime Japanese army and the continued Japanese-requested presence of U.S. forces, but also to prevent it from being displayed in public. Other incidents in Okinawa included the flag being torn down during school ceremonies and students refusing to honor the flag as it was being raised to the sounds of "Kimigayo".

In late January 2021, the ruling Liberal Democratic Party announced its intention to pass a law in the Diet to prohibit the desecration of the Hinomaru.

Malaysia
While Malaysia does not have specific legislation regarding flag desecration, legal action can be taken against those who show disrespect towards the national flag Jalur Gemilang under the Penal Code (Act 574), Sedition Act 1948 (Act 15) and the Emblems & Names (Prevention of Control of Improper Use) 1963 (Act 193). In October 2013, the Law Minister Nancy Shukri announced that the Government would be removing the proposed Clause 5 amendment to the Penal Code, which proposed fining or jailing anyone charged with desecrating the Jalur Gemilang or a foreign flag for a term of between five and fifteen years. She clarified that provisions for safeguarding the national flag would be added under the proposed National Harmony Act.

Nine Australian men, the 'Budgie Nine', were arrested after celebrating the 2016 Malaysian Grand Prix by stripping to their 'budgie smuggler' swimming trunks, decorated with the Malaysian flag. After three days in custody they were charged with public nuisance and released. The briefs had been made in Australia, not Malaysia.

In 2013, a group of Chinese Malaysian students in Taiwan, were photographed with an upside-down national flag, and claimed the action was "to express their dissatisfaction of the just-concluded general election that they alleged was carried out in an undemocratic way". In another incident, a Chinese Malaysian businessman Lee Kim Yew was reported to have dishonoring the national flag by changing its white stripes to black in an online post. The image, which has since been removed, was uploaded along with a post by Lee highlighting his recent blog entry on the inclusion of Jawi script lessons in Malay-language textbooks for Year 4 students. His action drew widespread online criticism and Lee's Facebook account appeared to have been deactivated later on.

Mexico
The use of the National Symbols (Coat of Arms, Anthem, and National Flag) in Mexico is protected by law. In Mexico the desecration of the flag is illegal. Although punishment is not sought often and are usually not harsh, there are a few instances; for example, in 2008 a federal judge convicted an individual for 'desecrating the flag' in a poem. The ministry that oversees the use of national symbols requested four years in jail, but the judge only issued a small fine and a public warning.

Nepal
Burning the national flag is illegal in Nepal.The Criminal Code has a provision of a three-year jail sentence or Rs 30,000 (about 300$) fine or both if one is found disrespecting or damaging the national anthem or the national flag.This ban is currently in practice

New Zealand
In New Zealand, under the Flags, Emblems and Names Protection Act 1981 it is illegal to destroy the New Zealand flag with the intent of dishonouring it. In 2003, Paul Hopkinson, a Wellington schoolteacher, burned the national flag of New Zealand as part of a protest in Parliament grounds at the New Zealand Government's hosting of the Prime Minister of Australia, against the background of Australia's support of the United States in the Iraq War. Hopkinson was initially convicted under Flags, Emblems and Names Protection Act 1981 of destroying a New Zealand flag with intent to dishonour it, but appealed against his conviction. On appeal, his conviction was overturned on the grounds that the law had to be read consistently with the right to freedom of expression under the Bill of Rights. This meant that his actions were not unlawful because the word dishonour in the Flags, Emblems and Names Protection Act had many shades of meaning, and when the least restrictive meaning of that word was adopted Hopkinson's actions did not meet that standard. This somewhat unusual result was due in part to the fact that the Bill of Rights does not overrule other laws (Hopkinson v Police).

In 2007, activist Valerie Morse had burned the New Zealand flag during an ANZAC Day dawn service in Wellington. She was fined NZ$500 by the Wellington District Court and her conviction was upheld by the High Court and the Court of Appeal. After Morse's lawyers appealed the conviction on the grounds that she was being punished for expressing ideas, the New Zealand Supreme Court ruled in 2011 that the previous rulings had misinterpreted the meaning of "offensive behavior" in the Summary Offences Act.

North Macedonia
Desecration of the national flag, coat of arms or anthem and international flags, coat of arms or anthems is banned under Articles 178 and 181 in the Criminal Code of North Macedonia.

It is questionable if these laws are enforced as there have been many instances where the national and foreign flags were set on fire.

Norway
Desecration of foreign countries' flags or national coats of arms was previously banned according to the General Civil Penal Code §95. The ban had, however, rarely been practiced, and was eventually lifted in 2008.

Comedian Otto Jespersen burned a U.S. flag during a satirical TV show in 2003.
During the Jyllands-Posten Muhammad cartoons controversy, Norwegian flags were burned in demonstrations in various Muslim countries.

Pakistan
Pakistan's flag comes under the strict protection of various constitutional clauses. However, the statutes governing the topic consist only of Pakistan Flag Protocols and are unclear as with regards to legal status of the offender and the punishment under the Pakistan Penal Code.

Panama
On 9 January 1964, a dispute broke out between Panamanian students and Americans living in the Panama Canal Zone over the right of the flag of Panama to be raised next to the flag of the United States, as the Canal Zone was then a disputed territory between the two nations. During the scuffle a Panamanian flag carried by Panamanian students was torn. This sparked four days of riots that ended with 22 Panamanians and four Americans dead and with Panama breaking diplomatic relations with the United States. This event is considered very important in the decision to negotiate and sign the Torrijos-Carter Treaties, by whose terms the Panama Canal administration was handed over to the Panamanian Government on 31 December 1999. 9 January is known as Martyrs' Day and is commemorated in Panama as a day of mourning.

Peru
The precise law in Peru is unclear, but such acts are clearly capable of causing outrage. In 2008 the dancer, model and actress Leysi Suárez appeared naked photographed using Peru's flag as a saddle while mounted on a horse. The country's defence minister said she would face charges that could put her in jail for up to four years for offending patriotic symbols". However, the case was closed in 2010.

Philippines
Section 34a of the 1998 Flag and Heraldic Code of the Philippines declares that it is a prohibited act "to mutilate, deface, defile, trample on or cast contempt or commit any act or omission casting dishonor or ridicule upon the flag or over its surface;"

Section 50 meanwhile declares, "Any person or judicial entity which violates any of the provisions of this Act shall, upon conviction, be punished by a fine of not less than five thousand pesos (₱5,000.00) not more than twenty thousand pesos (₱20,000.00), or by imprisonment for not more than one (1) year, or both such fine and imprisonment, at the discretion of the court: Provided, That for any second and additional offenses, both fine and imprisonment shall always be imposed: Provided, That in case the violation is committed by a juridical person, its President or Chief Executive Officer thereof shall be liable."

Flag burning is only permitted, in the case of proper disposal of the flag.

A crucial point of etiquette for the Philippine flag is that flying it upside-down (i.e., red field over blue), or vertically hanging it with the red to the viewer's left, makes it the national war standard. Outside of an official state of war, Filipinos consider this a major faux-pas or a highly offensive act: several instances of this incorrect display (usually by foreigners) have attracted online backlash, prompting official apologies.

Poland
Polish Criminal Code (1997) declares:

Article 137. § 1. "Whoever publicly insults, destroys, damages or removes an emblem, banner, standard, flag, ensign or other symbol of the State shall be subject to a fine, the penalty of restriction of liberty or the penalty of deprivation of liberty for up to one year." § 2. "The same punishment shall be imposed on anyone, who on the territory of the Republic of Poland publicly insults, destroys, damages or removes an emblem, banner, standard, flag, ensign or other symbol of another State, publicly displayed by a mission of this State or upon an order of a Polish authority." Article 138. § 1. "The provisions of Articles 136 and 137 § 2 shall apply, when the foreign country ensures reciprocity."

Portugal
Currently, according to article 332 of the Penal Code, "Who publicly, by means of words, gestures or print publication, or by other means of public communication, insults the Republic, the Flag or the National Anthem, the coats of arms or the symbols of Portuguese sovereignty, or fails to show the respect they are entitled to, shall be punished with up to two years' imprisonment or a fine of up to 240 days". In the case of the regional symbols, the person shall be punished with up to one year's imprisonment or a fine of up to 120 days (fines are calculated based on the defendant's income).

The Portuguese Penal Code (article 323) also forbids the desecration of foreign symbols: "Who publicly, by means of words, gestures or print publication, or by other means of public communication, insults the official flag or other symbol of sovereignty of a foreign State or of an international organization of which Portugal is a member shall be punished with up to one year imprisonment or a fine of up to 120 days." This article applies under two conditions (article 324): that Portugal maintains diplomatic relations with the insulted country, and that there is reciprocity (i.e., that the insulted country would also punish any insult against Portuguese symbols of sovereignty, should they occur there).

On 5 October 2012, Aníbal Cavaco Silva, then-President of the Republic, during the celebration of the 102 years of the Portuguese Republic, mistakenly flew the national flag upside down, which generated much controversy, with the Portuguese people regarding it as a "joke" and as a sign of disrespect.

Romania
The Romanian Criminal Code no longer prohibits flag desecration (as it was the case with the previous criminal code). Several laws attempting to reinstate punishments for manifestations which express contempt for the Romanian symbols (according to the constitution, these are the flag, national day, anthem and coat-of-arms) have not been approved.

During the Romanian Revolution of 1989, the Communist era flag was flown with the coat of arms cut out, leaving a hole.

Russia
In February 2011, Japanese ultra-rightists held a protest over the Kuril islands dispute outside of the Russian embassy in Tokyo, during which they dragged a Russian flag on the ground; Russian foreign minister Sergei Lavrov stated that his ministry had asked the Japanese government to launch a criminal case over the incident.

In 2013, the U.S. rock band Bloodhound Gang desecrated a Russian flag during a concert in Ukraine. In response, Vladimir Markin of the Investigative Committee of Russia said that his department was prepared to file criminal charges if prosecutors thought they had a case.

National flag burning is illegal in Russia and punishable by up to one year in prison.

Saudi Arabia
The flag of Saudi Arabia bears the shahada (Islamic declaration of faith). Because the shahada is considered holy, even the slightest disrespect amounts to not only desecration but blasphemy. This has led to several incidents of controversy. In 1994, McDonald's printed carry-out bags bearing the flags of all nations participating in the FIFA World Cup (with a green flag with Saudi Arabia's coat of arms superimposed, rather than the Saudi flag), while Coca-Cola did the same on cans of soda. Because of Saudi Arabian objections, the companies stopped producing those items. Also during the FIFA World Cup, in 2002, Saudi Arabian officials protested against printing the flag on a soccer ball on the belief that kicking the creed with the foot was unacceptable.

Flying the Saudi flag at half-mast is considered desecration in Saudi Arabia.

Serbia
In Serbia, flag desecration is illegal.

South Africa

During the apartheid era, protesters would burn the (now former) South African flag in protest against the apartheid policies of the South African government. In one example, Americans opposed to apartheid burned the then-South African flag at an anti-apartheid protest in the U.S. state of Massachusetts during the mid-1980s. South Africans opposed to minority rule also burned the (now former) South African flag, viewing it as a symbol of the country's government at the time.

Even the current South African flag designed and adopted in 1994 has been the subject of desecration. In early 1994, white supremacists from the "Afrikaner Volksfront" organization burned the then-new South African flag in Bloemfontein in protest against the country's pending democratization.

South Korea

The South Korean Criminal Act punishes flag desecration, of both domestic and foreign, in various ways:

Article 105 imposes up to 5 years in prison, disfranchisement of up to 10 years, or a fine up to 7 million South Korean won for damaging, removing, or staining a South Korean flag or emblem with intent to insult the South Korean state. Article 5 makes this crime punishable, even if done by aliens outside South Korea.
Article 106 imposes up to 1 years in prison, disfranchisement of up to 5 years, or a fine up to 2 million South Korean won for defaming a South Korean flag or emblem with intent to insult the South Korean state. Article 5 makes this crime punishable, even if done by aliens outside South Korea.
Article 109 imposes up to 2 years in prison or a fine up to 3 million South Korean won for damaging, removing, or staining a foreign flag or emblem with intent to insult a foreign country. Article 110 forbids prosecution without foreign governmental complaint.

Soviet Union
The flag of the Soviet Union was burned many times by protestors against its government's policies, for instance in Brazil by those protesting the Warsaw Pact invasion of Czechoslovakia of 1968, and in New York City in 1985 by protesters against the Soviet–Afghan War. The Soviet flag was burned or otherwise desecrated during the Euromaidan in Ukraine.

Spain
The Spanish Penal Code punishes with prison sentences insulting the flag of Spain and the flags of the autonomous communities of Spain.
However, flag burning is often seen in nationalist riots.

Sweden
In Swedish law, there is no explicit prohibition against burning the flag of any country. The desecration of national was decriminalized in 1971. However, publicly showing a Swedish flag modified with added marks, characters or symbols is forbidden according flag law number 1982:269, and may be punishable under the provisions regarding disorderly conduct ("förargelseväckande beteende") under the chapter 16 § 16 of the criminal code. In 1997 a man was fined SEK 500 for waving a modified Swedish flag during an event celebrating the National Day. The royal family being present, the event being part of Lycksele 50 year jubilee celebrations, and the presence of a large audience, were all seen as factors in the sentence.

Switzerland
Destruction, removal, or desecration of national emblems installed by a public authority (i.e., the Swiss flag, the Swiss coat of arms, the cantonal or municipal flags and coats of arms) is punishable by a monetary penalty or imprisonment of up to three years according to the Swiss federal penal code. The destruction or desecration of privately owned flags or coats of arms is legal.

Taiwan 
Under Articles 118 and 160 of the Criminal Law of Taiwan, it is a criminal offence to insult either the national flag or the national emblem of any country. If it is a national flag or emblem of a foreign country being insulted, the name of the offence would be ‘obstructing state diplomacy’; if it is the ones of Taiwan, the offence would be ‘disturbing the order’. Besides, insulting or damaging the portrait of Sun Yat-sen is also punishable as ‘disturbing the order’. The penalty can be either incarceration for one year or less, or a fine of $9,000 NTD or less.

Thailand
In October 2018, Prime Minister Prayut Chan-o-cha ordered the Foreign Ministry to investigate fashion footwear in Paris that incorporates the colours of the Thai national flag. Photos of the shoes, shown on the Vogue Paris Facebook page taken during Paris Fashion Week, outraged Thai social media users, some of whom demanded apologies and jail sentences for the perpetrators. As was pointed out in the Bangkok daily, The Nation, "The combination of the Thai flag and human feet is a contentious cultural cocktail for Thais."

The designers are immune from prosecution as the shoes were made and displayed outside Thailand. Were the offence committed in Thailand, those responsible could face a 2,000 baht fine or a year in jail.

A spokesman at the Thai National Flag Museum commented that no one has a copyright on the flag's colours or the order in which they are presented.

Turkey

Under the 1983 Turkish flag law, burning the flag is strictly forbidden, punishable by a prison sentence of three years. Displaying or pulling a torn or discolored flag to flagpole is also illegal. Taking down the flag is prohibited and punishable by a prison sentence of eighteen years.

Ukraine 
In Ukraine, desecration of national symbols, including the national flag, is a crime punishable by up to three years in jail.

United Kingdom

The law of England and Wales and the law of Scotland have no specific concept of "flag desecration".

In May 1998, in a protest by 2,000 former prisoners of war, a Burma Railway veteran torched the Rising Sun banner before both Emperor Akihito and Queen Elizabeth. Police were persuaded by the crowd not to arrest him. A year later, two "committed socialists" threw a burning British flag in the direction of the Queen's motor vehicle. They were arrested for a breach of the peace offence, subsequently pleaded guilty and were fined a total of £450. In 2001 at RAF Feltwell, home of United States Air Force's 5th Space Surveillance Squadron, a protester desecrated a U.S. flag with the words "Stop Star Wars" before stepping in front of a vehicle and stomping on the flag. Her conviction under S5 Public Order Act 1986 was overturned as incompatible with Article 10 of the European Convention on Human Rights.

In 2011, a group of approximately 20–30  students at King's College, Cambridge influenced the burning of a large British flag, the centerpiece of the Student Union's decorations to celebrate the royal wedding. King's College Student Union condemned the action as a "needlessly divisive and violent way to make a political point... [the] Union flag is a symbol and therefore can mean different things to different people in different contexts."

The Union Flag has also been burned by Argentine nationalists protesting British sovereignty of the Falkland Islands.

In 2006, to allow greater police control over extremist protesters, 17 MPs signed a House of Commons motion calling for burning of the British flag to be made a criminal offence.

Northern Ireland

Unlike the rest of the United Kingdom, the law in Northern Ireland has varied since its foundation in 1921. The British flag, the former flag of Northern Ireland, and the Irish flag are often desecrated or burnt in Northern Ireland by various groups as a political statement/provocation or in protest.

Also in Northern Ireland, Ulster loyalists have sometimes mistakenly desecrated the Ivorian flag, erroneously mistaking it for the Irish one as the two are somewhat similar in appearance. In some cases, Ivorian flags displayed in Northern Ireland have signs explicitly labeling them as such displayed nearby to avoid having them desecrated by Ulster loyalists mistaking them for Irish ones.

United States

The flag of the United States is sometimes burned as a cultural or political statement, in protest of the policies of the U.S. government, or for other reasons, both within the U.S. and abroad. The United States Supreme Court in Texas v. Johnson, and reaffirmed in U.S. v. Eichman, has ruled that due to the First Amendment to the United States Constitution, it is unconstitutional for a government (whether federal, state, or municipal) to prohibit the desecration of a flag, due to its status as "symbolic speech." However, content-neutral restrictions may still be imposed to regulate the time, place, and manner of such expression. If the flag that was burned was someone else's property (as it was in the Johnson case, since Johnson had stolen the flag from a Texas bank's flagpole), the offender could be charged with petty larceny (a flag usually sells at retail for less than US$20), or with destruction of private property, or possibly both. Desecration of a flag representing a minority group may also be charged as a hate crime in some jurisdictions.

In the American Civil War, the U.S. flag was flown by the Union against the Confederacy. Union Army general Benjamin Franklin Butler ordered the 1862 execution for treason of William B. Mumford, who had removed a Union flag in occupied New Orleans. An apocryphal tale of Barbara Fritchie preventing Confederate soldiers dishonoring her Union flag was propagated by John Greenleaf Whittier's 1863 poem "Barbara Frietchie", which contains the famous lines:
"Shoot, if you must, this old gray head,
But spare your country's flag," she said.

During the United States' involvement in the Vietnam War, American flags were sometimes burned during war protest demonstrations.

After the Johnson decision, the Flag Protection Act was passed, protecting flags from anyone who "mutilates, defaces, physically defiles, burns, maintains on the floor or ground, or tramples upon any flag". This decision was later struck down in the Eichman decision. After that case, several flag burning amendments to the Constitution were proposed. On June 22, 2005, a Flag Desecration Amendment was passed by the House with the needed two-thirds majority. On June 27, 2006, another attempt to pass a ban on flag burning was rejected by the Senate in a close vote of 66 in favor and 34 opposed, one vote short of the two-thirds majority needed to send the amendment to be voted on by the states.

There have been several proposed Flag Desecration Amendments to the Constitution of the United States that would allow Congress to enact laws to prohibit flag desecration:
Douglas Applegate (Ohio) in 1991
Spencer Bachus (Alabama) in 2013
Steve Daines (Montana) in 2019
Robert Dornan (California) in 1991
Bill Emerson (Missouri) in 1991, 1993, 1995
Randy Cunningham (California) in 1999, 2001, 2003,
Jo Ann Emerson (Missouri) in 1997, 1999, 2001, 2003, 2005, 2007, 2009, 2011, 2013
John P. Hammerschmidt (Arkansas), 1991
Orrin Hatch (Utah) in 1995, 1998, 1999, 2001, 2003, 2005, 2011, 2013
Andrew Jacobs Jr. (Indiana) in 1995
Joseph M. McDade (Pennsylvania) in 1989, 1995, 1996
Clarence E. Miller (Ohio) in 1991
John Murtha (Pennsylvania) in 2007
Ron Paul (Texas) in 1997, but he opposed any federal prohibition of flag desecration, including his own Flag Desecration Amendment which he proposed only as a protest against proposals by his Congressional colleagues, such as Emerson and Solomon, to ban flag desecration through ordinary legislation instead of by Constitutional Amendment.
Gerald B. H. Solomon (New York) in 1991, 1993, 1995, 1997
Floyd Spence (South Carolina) in 1991
David Vitter (Louisiana) in 2009

During a rally in June 2020, President Donald Trump told supporters that he thinks flag burning should be punishable by one year in prison.

Flag burning

In common usage, the phrase "flag burning" refers only to burning a flag as an act of protest. However, the United States Flag Code states that "the flag, when it is in such condition that it is no longer a fitting emblem for display (for example, the flag being faded or torn), should be destroyed in a dignified way, preferably by burning."

Flying a U.S. flag upside down

Displaying a U.S. flag upside down is "a signal of dire distress in instances of extreme danger to life or property." It has been used by extension to make a statement about distress in civic, political, or other areas. It is most often meant as political protest, and is usually interpreted as such. The musical group Rage Against the Machine, a group known for songs expressing revolutionary political views, displayed two upside-down American flags from their amplifiers on the April 13, 1996 episode of Saturday Night Live. This was intended to indicate protest about the host, billionaire businessman Steve Forbes. The flags were ripped down by stagehands about 20 seconds before the group's performance of "Bulls on Parade". Afterward, show officials asked band members to leave the building as they were waiting in their dressing room to perform "Bullet in the Head" later in the show.

Flying flags upside down has been used as a sign of protest against U.S. Presidents.

In 2020, as protests spread across the U.S. demanding an end to police brutality, some U.S. citizens chose to fly their flags upside down as part of the protests.

Confederate flag
The Battle Flag of the Army of Northern Virginia, commonly referred to as the Confederate flag, has sometimes been burned in protest as well. In 2000, protesters from the Jewish Defense League burned Confederate and Nazi flags to protest an arson attempt against a Reno, Nevada synagogue. This was criticized by a representative of the Anti-Defamation League, who said that it was more effective to work with the police and other authorities rather than to engage in "tactics which inflame and exacerbate situations."

Of the states which continue to have laws against flag burning, in spite of them being ruled unconstitutional, five afford this protection to the Virginian battle flag as well: Florida, Georgia, Louisiana, Mississippi, and South Carolina.

Uruguay
Desecration of the national flag of Uruguay is forbidden, and desecration of the national flag by an Uruguayan citizen is regarded as mischief of loyalty; improper manipulation or adulteration of national symbols is prohibited.

Article 28 law  9.943 of July 20, 1940 and reglementary decrees of December 19 of that year and May 26, June 10 and 1 July 1943 say
″Every citizen, legal or natural, is obligated to swear a loyal oath at the National Flag, by means of public and solemn act.″
Every natural or legal citizen is obligated to manifest public and solemn loyalty at the national flag.
Desecration of foreign flags is not forbidden, it is prohibited for buildings to raise any flag other than national ones, implying that Departments' flags cannot be raised on municipality buildings.

The Oath to the flag has to be taken by citizens at least once in life, the formal act is given on special celebration at a 19 June at every educational institute, defection contrives plenty granting of citizenship rights.

Damaged national flags are burnt by the Uruguayan army every 23 September.

Venezuela
Since the demonstrations against the refusal by the government to renew the broadcasting license of RCTV (a major TV network), the upside-down flag of Venezuela has been adopted as a symbol of protest for this and other alleged threats to civil liberties. Demonstrators claim that it is a sign of distress and a call for help. However, government and ruling-party officials insist that these demonstrators are desecrating the flag. An official video sharply criticizing this practice as disrespectful was produced. Globovisión prepended to the video a statement denouncing the message as violative of the Law on Social Responsibility on Radio and Television, "for constituting anonymous official propaganda".

References

Civil disobedience
Desecration
Protest tactics